A charged particle accelerator is a complex machine that takes elementary charged particles and accelerates them to very high energies.  Accelerator physics is a field of physics encompassing all the aspects required to design and operate the equipment and to understand the resulting dynamics of the charged particles.  There are software packages associated with each such domain. There are a large number of such codes. The 1990 edition of the Los Alamos Accelerator Code Group's compendium  provides summaries of more than 200 codes. Certain of those codes are still in use today although many are obsolete. Another index of existing and historical accelerator simulation codes is located at

Single particle dynamics codes
For many applications it is sufficient to track a single particle through the relevant electric and magnetic fields.
Old codes no longer maintained by their original authors or home institutions include: BETA, AGS, ALIGN, COMFORT, DESIGN, DIMAD, HARMON, LEGO, LIAR, MAGIC, MARYLIE, PATRICIA, PETROS, RACETRACK, SYNCH, TRANSPORT, TURTLE, and UAL. Some legacy codes are maintained by commercial organizations for academic, industrial and medical accelerator facilities that continue to use those codes.  TRANSPORT, TRACE 3-D and TURTLE are among the historic codes that are commercially maintained.

Major maintained codes include:

Columns

Spin Tracking
Tracking of a particle's spin.

Taylor Maps
Construction of Taylor series maps to high order that can be used for simulating particle motion and also can be used for such things as extracting single particle resonance strengths.

Weak-Strong Beam-Beam Interaction 
Can simulate the beam-beam interaction with the simplification that one beam is essentially fixed in size. See below for a list of strong-strong interaction codes.

Electromagnetic Field Tracking 
Can track (ray trace) a particle through arbitrary electromagnetic fields.

Higher Energy Collective effects
The interactions between the particles in the beam can have important effects on the behavior, control and dynamics. Collective effects take different forms from Intrabeam Scattering (IBS) which is a direct particle-particle interaction to wakefields which are mediated by the vacuum chamber wall of the machine the particles are traveling in. In general, the effect of direct particle-particle interactions is less with higher energy particle beams. At very low energies, space charge has a large effect on a particle beam and thus becomes hard to calculate. See below for a list of programs that can handle low energy space charge forces.

Synchrotron radiation tracking
Ability to track the synchrotron radiation (mainly X-rays) produced by the acceleration of charged particles.

Wakefields
The electro-magnetic interaction between the beam and the vacuum chamber wall enclosing the beam are known as wakefields. Wakefields produce forces that affect the trajectory of the particles of the beam and can potentially destabilize the trajectories.

Extensible
Open source and object oriented coding to make it relatively easy to extend the capabilities.

Space Charge Codes
The self interaction (e.g. space charge) of the charged particle beam can cause growth of the beam, such as with bunch lengthening, or intrabeam scattering. Additionally, space charge effects may cause instabilities and associated beam loss. Typically, at relatively low energies (roughly for energies where the relativistic gamma factor is less than 10 or so), the Poisson equation is solved at intervals during the tracking using Particle-in-cell algorithms. Space charge effects lessen at higher energies so at higher energies the space charge effects may be modeled using simpler algorithms that are computationally much faster than the algorithms used at lower energies.
Codes that handle low energy space charge effects include:
 ASTRA 
 Bmad
 CST Studio Suite 
 GPT 
 IMPACT 
 mbtrack 
 ORBIT, PyORBIT
 OPAL 
 PyHEADTAIL 
 Synergia 
 TraceWin 
 Tranft 
 VSim 
 Warp 

At higher energies, space charge effects include Touschek scattering and coherent synchrotron radiation (CSR). Codes that handle higher energy space charge include:
 Bmad
 ELEGANT
 MaryLie
 SAD

"Strong-Strong" Beam-beam effects codes 
When two beams collide, the electromagnetic field of one beam will then have strong effects on the other one, called beam-beam effects. So called "weak-strong" simulations model one beam (called the "strong" beam since it affects the other beam) as a fixed distribution (typically a Gaussian distribution) which interacts with the particles of the other "weak" beam. This greatly simplifies the simulation.  A full "strong-strong" simulation is more complicated and takes more simulation time.  Strong-strong codes include
GUINEA-PIG

Impedance computation codes
An important class of collective effects may be summarized in terms of the beams response to an "impedance".  An important job is thus the computation of this impedance for the machine.  Codes for this computation include
ABCI 
ACE3P 
CST Studio Suite 
GdfidL
TBCI 
 VSim

Magnet and other hardware-modeling codes
To control the charged particle beam, appropriate electric and magnetic fields must be created.  There are software packages to help in the design and understanding of the magnets, RF cavities, and other elements that create these fields. Codes include
ACE3P 
COMSOL Multiphysics 
CST Studio Suite 
OPERA 
 VSim

Lattice file format and data interchange issues
Given the variety of modelling tasks, there is not one common data format that has developed.
For describing the layout of an accelerator and the corresponding elements, one uses a so-called "lattice file".
There have been numerous attempts at unifying the lattice file formats used in different codes.  One unification attempt is the Accelerator Markup Language, and the Universal Accelerator Parser.  Another attempt at a unified approach to accelerator codes is the UAL or Universal Accelerator Library.

The file formats used in
MAD may be the most common, with translation routines available to convert to an input form needed for a different code. 
Associated with the Elegant code is a data format called SDDS, with an associated suite of tools.  If one uses a Matlab-based code, such as Accelerator Toolbox, one has available all the tools within Matlab.

Codes in applications of particle accelerators
There are many applications of particle accelerators.  For example, two important applications are elementary particle physics and synchrotron radiation production.  When performing a modeling task for any accelerator operation, the results of charged particle beam dynamics simulations must feed into the associated application.  Thus, for a full simulation, one must include the codes in associated applications.  For particle physics, the simulation may be continued in a detector with a code such as Geant4.

For a synchrotron radiation facility, for example, the electron beam produces an x-ray beam that then travels down a beamline before reaching the experiment.  Thus, the electron beam modeling software must interface with the x-ray optics modelling software such as SRW, Shadow, McXTrace, or Spectra. Bmad can model both X-rays and charged particle beams.  The x-rays are used in an experiment which may be modeled and analyzed with various software, such as the DAWN science platform. OCELOT  also includes both synchrotron radiation calculation and x-ray propagation models.

Industrial and medical accelerators represent another area of important applications.  A 2013 survey estimated that there were about 27,000 industrial accelerators and another 14,000 medical accelerators world wide, and those numbers have continued to increase since that time.  Codes used at those facilities vary considerably and often include a mix of traditional codes and custom codes developed for specific applications.  The Advanced Orbit Code (AOC) developed at Ion_Beam_Applications is an example.

See also
 List of codes from UCLA Particle Beam Physics Laboratory
 Comparison of Accelerator Codes

References

Accelerator physics
Scientific simulation software